Portbury railway station was a railway station serving the village and shipyard of Portbury in Somerset, near Bristol, England. It opened in 1867 and closed in 1962.
The line through the station was closed in 1964 and the former station house is now a private dwelling.

A three-mile stretch of the former line between Portbury and Portishead was bought by North Somerset Council in 2008 in order to keep the option of re-opening the line alive.

References 

Former Great Western Railway stations
Disused railway stations in Somerset
Railway stations in Great Britain opened in 1867
Railway stations in Great Britain closed in 1962